Pouteria peduncularis is a species of plant in the family Sapotaceae. It is endemic to Brazil.  Its status is insufficiently known.

References

Flora of Brazil
peduncularis
Data deficient plants
Taxonomy articles created by Polbot